Hampi is a 2017 Indian Marathi language film directed by Prakash Kunte, starring Sonalee Kulkarni, Lalit Prabhakar, Prajakta Mali, Priyadarshan Jadhav, Vijay Nikam & Chhaya Kadam.

Plot 
Isha is hurt by her parents' divorce. So she hates people and does not believe in love. She visits Hampi in Karnataka, in search of happiness. She meets many people, including Kabir who helps her find happiness in the little things. They become friends and after some time she falls in love with him. One day, Kabir disappears suddenly without informing anyone. In the end, Isha realises the value of people and true love.

Cast 

 Sonalee Kulkarni as Isha, a girl who is depressed due to her parents' divorce
 Lalit Prabhakar as Kabir, a young bachelor in the neighborhood of Isha's hotel room
 Prajakta Mali as Girija, a fun-loving girl, friend of Isha
 Priyadarshan Jadhav as Ranjeet, an auto rickshaw driver and tourist guide
 Vijay Nikam as Shankar, a Sadhu
 Chhaya Kadam as Ashabai, a handicraft items seller
 Ruturaaj Shinde as Raj
 Sayali Rathod as Lamani Bai's aughter-in-law

Production 
The film is set against Hampi's backdrop.

Release 
The film was released on 17 November 2017. The film was later released on streaming platform ZEE5.

Reception

Box office 

Critical reception 

Mihir Bhanage of The Times of India rated the film 3 out of 5 stars. He praised cinematography, philosophy an performances but criticised the story. Blessy Chettiar of Cinestaan described the film as a genuine attempt of story, screenplay and dialogue writer Aditi Moghe Ulhas Shirke of MarathiMovieWorld rated it 3.5/5 praising cinematography and theme. Zee News and Maharashtra Times rated it 3/5. Ganesh Matkari writing for the Pune Mirror rated it 2.5 put of 5 and praised it production design and criticised its lack of story placing it between romantic comedy and travel film. Film journalist Amol Parchure praised cinematography and music and criticised lack of depth in some characters. He rated it 2.5/5.

References

External links 

 

2010s Marathi-language films
2017 films
2017 romantic comedy films
Indian comedy road movies
Indian romantic comedy films
Films set in Karnataka
Films shot in Karnataka
2010s comedy road movies